Yass Town railway station  is a heritage-listed former railway station and now museum at Yass Town Tramway, Yass, Yass Valley Shire, New South Wales, Australia. It is also known as the Yass Railway Museum. The property was added to the New South Wales State Heritage Register on 2 April 1999.

History 

The Yass Town branch tramway was formally closed in 1988. The Australian Railway Historical Society (ACT Division) negotiated with the State Rail Authority and the then-Yass Shire regarding the future of the tramway and yard, resulting in the council assuming control and leasing the station to the ARHS. The Yass Railway Museum opened in the former station building on the centenary of the tramway's opening, 20 April 1992. 

The museum subsequently returned to control of the council, and continues to operate out of the former station.

Description 

The station precinct consists of a group of buildings constructed in 1891-1892. The station building is a type 4 timber roadside station. The site also contains a timber shed, a corrugated iron lamp room, and a goods shed consisting of a side shed without awning.

The platform is timber and at ground level due to having been used for a tramway. A T42 5 ton jib crane and an Avery 4cwt weighing machine are located at the station.

The track formation and track along Dutton Street also forms part of the heritage listing.

Heritage listing 
Yass Town group of buildings is a site of high significance and of unusual layout and design. It is the only surviving tramway (or light railway) station complex. This is shown by having all the buildings at ground level without a significant platform. The buildings date from 1892, with unusual non-standard buildings. Apart from the removal of the loco shed it is an intact group. The station building is perhaps the best surviving example of a timber roadside standard station building.

Yass Town railway station was listed on the New South Wales State Heritage Register on 2 April 1999 having satisfied the following criteria.

The place possesses uncommon, rare or endangered aspects of the cultural or natural history of New South Wales.

This item is assessed as historically rare. This item is assessed as scientifically rare. This item is assessed as arch. rare. This item is assessed as socially rare.

See also

References

Bibliography

Attribution

External links

New South Wales State Heritage Register
Yass, New South Wales
Disused regional railway stations in New South Wales
Railway museums in New South Wales
Articles incorporating text from the New South Wales State Heritage Register
Railway stations closed in 1988